KZMA is a radio station airing an adult contemporary format licensed to Naylor, Missouri, broadcasting on 99.9 MHz FM.  The station serves the Poplar Bluff, Missouri area and is owned by Daniel S. Stratemeyer.

References

External links

Mainstream adult contemporary radio stations in the United States
ZMA